Luigi Stillo (born January 6, 1984, in Tivoli) is an Italian professional football player. He is currently unattached.

He played for several Serie C1 teams and for the Italian national under-20 team.

He lives in Rome.

External links
 

1984 births
Living people
Italian footballers
A.C. Reggiana 1919 players
Giulianova Calcio players
A.S. Sambenedettese players
Association football midfielders